Aidan Gillett (born 12 April 1986) is an Australian actor and stunt performer, who is best known for his roles as Daniel McManus in the BBC-commissioned soap opera Out of the Blue and Robert Cruze in Home and Away.

Early life
Gillett was born and raised in the Blue Mountains region west of Sydney, Australia. In his early years, his main interests were music and sport, studying piano at the age of five, learning to play guitar at seven and focusing on jazz by the age of ten. He chose not to study drama at high school, instead continuing to focus on music and sport, particularly soccer and snowboarding.

In 2004, while working as a concierge and pursuing a Bachelor of Music, Gillett was encouraged by his manager to pursue an acting career. He subsequently trained at the National Institute of Dramatic Art in Sydney.

Career
Gillett appeared in the Martin Crimp play Attempts on Her Life while studying at the National Institute of Dramatic Art late in 2007.
After graduating from NIDA, Gillett appeared in Steven Spielberg's Australian production The Pacific.

In early 2008, it was announced that he had been cast in Out of the Blue, a BBC-commissioned soap opera, playing the role of Daniel McManus. The series premiered in the UK on BBC One on 28 April 2008 but was later moved to BBC Two after three weeks. The show ran for 130 episodes but is not expected to be commissioned for a second series following disappointing ratings. It started airing nightly in Australia on 17 November 2008 on Network Ten, before being moved to an earlier slot on Sunday evenings in January 2009.
In 2009, Gillett started appearing in Home and Away, playing the guest role of Robert Cruze. In 2010, Gillett appearing in the first episode of Cops L.A.C. as Peter, the grieving partner. In 2014 Aidan began a transition into stunt work, grading with the MEAA in 2015. He has since performed in many feature films and television shows including Hacksaw Ridge, Cargo and Home & Away

Filmography
 2007 The Pacific
 2008 Out of the Blue as Daniel McManus
 2009 Home and Away as Robert Cruze
 2010 Cops L.A.C. as Peter
 2015 River
 2015 Racka Racka
 2015 Home and Away

Awards and recognition

References

External links

1986 births
Living people
Australian male soap opera actors